Kapić is a Croatian surname and toponym. Kapić is the name of a mountain in Bosnia and Herzegovina. It may refer to:

 Ambroz Antun Kapić, Croatian Archbishop of Antivari [Bar] (born on Cres Island in 1529 - died in Budva in 1598)
 Virginia Kapić, Croato-Dutch political activist
 Bekim Kapić, Slovenian football player 
 Adem Kapič, Slovenian football player
 Rifet Kapić, Bosnian footballer

See also
 Kapići, a village in the municipality of Cazin.

Croatian surnames